Idogo (also spelled Idawgo) is a town in western Nigeria fairly close to the border with Benin.

Transport
Idogo is served by a terminus of a branch on the national railway network. A nearby river (Iyewa) also provides transportation of goods to other parts of western Africa, ipaja, olokuta, odon, including Cotonou.

See also
Railway stations in Nigeria

References

Towns in Nigeria